The Council of Europe (CoE;) is an international organisation founded in the wake of World War II to uphold human rights, democracy and the rule of law in Europe. Founded in 1949, it has 46 member states, with a population of approximately 675 million; it operates with an annual budget of approximately 500 million euros.

The organisation is distinct from the European Union (EU), although it is sometimes confused with it, partly because the EU has adopted the original European flag, created for the Council of Europe in 1955, as well as the European anthem. No country has ever joined the EU without first belonging to the Council of Europe. The Council of Europe is an official United Nations Observer.

Being an international organisation, the Council of Europe cannot make laws, but it does have the ability to push for the enforcement of select international agreements reached by member states on various topics. The best-known body of the Council of Europe is the European Court of Human Rights, which functions on the basis of the European Convention on Human Rights.

The council's two statutory bodies are the Committee of Ministers, which comprises the foreign ministers of each member state, and the Parliamentary Assembly of the Council of Europe (PACE), which is composed of members of the national parliaments of each member state. The Commissioner for Human Rights is an institution within the Council of Europe, mandated to promote awareness of and respect for human rights within the member states. The secretary general presides over the secretariat of the organisation. Other major CoE bodies include the European Directorate for the Quality of Medicines & HealthCare (EDQM) and the European Audiovisual Observatory.

The headquarters of the Council of Europe, as well as its Court of Human Rights, are situated in Strasbourg, France. English and French are its two official languages. The Committee of Ministers, the PACE, and the Congress of the Council of Europe also use German and Italian for some of their work.

History

Founding 

The Council of Europe is one of the oldest and the largest European organisation with 46 member states. The primary aim of creating the council was to create common democratic and legal parameters for its members states.

In a speech in 1929, French Foreign Minister Aristide Briand floated the idea of an organisation which would gather European nations together in a "federal union" to resolve common problems. But it was Britain's wartime leader Sir Winston Churchill who first publicly suggested the creation of a "Council of Europe" in a BBC radio broadcast on 21 March 1943, while the Second World War was still raging. In his own words, he tried to "peer through the mists of the future to the end of the war", and think about how to rebuild and maintain peace on a shattered continent. Given that Europe had been at the origin of two world wars, the creation of such a body would be, he suggested, "a stupendous business". He returned to the idea during a well-known speech at the University of Zurich on 19 September 1946, throwing the full weight of his considerable post-war prestige behind it. But there were many other statesmen and politicians across the continent, many of them members of the European Movement, who were quietly working towards the creation of the council. Some regarded it as a guarantee that the horrors of war could never again be visited on the continent, others came to see it as a "club of democracies", built around a set of common values that could stand as a bulwark against totalitarian states belonging to the Eastern Bloc. Others again saw it as a nascent "United States of Europe", the resonant phrase that Churchill had reached for at Zurich in 1946.

The future structure of the Council of Europe was discussed at the Congress of Europe which brought together several hundred leading politicians, government representatives and members of civil society in The Hague, Netherlands, in 1948. Responding to the conclusions of the Congress of Europe, the Consultative Council of the Treaty of Brussels convened a Committee for the Study of European Unity, which met eight times from November 1948 to January 1949 to draw up the blueprint of a new broad-based European organisation. There were two competing schools of thought: some favoured a classical international organisation with representatives of governments, while others preferred a political forum with parliamentarians. Both approaches were finally combined through the creation of a Committee of Ministers (in which governments were represented) and a Consultative Assembly (in which parliaments were represented), the two main bodies mentioned in the Statute of the Council of Europe. This dual intergovernmental and inter-parliamentary structure was later copied for the European Communities, NATO and OSCE.

The Council of Europe was signed into existence on 5 May 1949 by the Treaty of London, the organisation's founding Statute which set out the three basic values that should guide its work: democracy, human rights and the rule of law. It was signed in London on that day by ten states: Belgium, Denmark, France, Ireland, Italy, Luxembourg, the Netherlands, Norway, Sweden and the United Kingdom, though Turkey and Greece joined three months later. On 10 August 1949, 100 members of the council's Consultative Assembly, parliamentarians drawn from the twelve member nations, met in Strasbourg for its first plenary session, held over 18 sittings and lasting nearly a month. They debated how to reconcile and reconstruct a continent still reeling from war, yet already facing a new East–West divide, launched the concept of a trans-national court to protect the basic human rights of every citizen, and took the first steps in a process that would eventually lead to the creation of the European Union.

In August 1949, Paul-Henri Spaak resigned as Belgium's foreign minister in order to be elected as the first president of the assembly. Behind the scenes, he too had been quietly working towards the creation of the council, and played a key role in steering its early work. However, in December 1951, after nearly three years in the role, Spaak resigned in disappointment after the Assembly rejected proposals for a "European political authority". Convinced that the Council of Europe was never going to be in a position to achieve his long-term goal of a unified Europe, he soon tried again in a new and more promising format, based this time on economic integration, becoming one of the founders of the European Union.

Early years 

There was huge enthusiasm for the Council of Europe in its early years, as its pioneers set about drafting what was to become the European Convention on Human Rights, a charter of individual rights which – it was hoped – no member government could ever again violate. They drew, in part, on the tenets of the Universal Declaration of Human Rights, signed only a few months earlier in Paris. But crucially, where the Universal Declaration was essentially aspirational, the European Convention from the beginning featured an enforcement mechanism - an international Court - which was to adjudicate on alleged violations of its articles and to hold governments to account, a dramatic leap forward for international justice. Today, this is the European Court of Human Rights, whose rulings are binding on 46 European nations, the most far-reaching system of international justice anywhere in the world.

One of the council's first acts was to welcome West Germany into its fold on 2 May 1951, setting a pattern of post-war reconciliation that was to become a hallmark of the council, and beginning a long process of "enlargement" which was to see the organisation grow from its original ten founding member states to the 46 nations that make up the Council of Europe today. Iceland had already joined in 1950, followed in 1956 by Austria, Cyprus in 1961, Switzerland in 1963 and Malta in 1965.

Historic speeches at the Council of Europe 

In 2018, an archive of all speeches made to the PACE by heads of state or government since the Council of Europe's creation in 1949 appeared online, the fruit of a two-year project entitled "Voices of Europe". At the time of its launch, the archive comprised 263 speeches delivered over a 70-year period by some 216 presidents, prime ministers, monarchs and religious leaders from 45 countries – though it continues to expand, as new speeches are added every few months.

Some very early speeches by individuals considered to be "founding figures" of the European institutions, even if they were not heads of state or government at the time, are also included (such as Sir Winston Churchill or Robert Schuman). Addresses by eight monarchs appear in the list (such as King Juan Carlos I of Spain, King Albert II of Belgium and Grand Duke Henri of Luxembourg) as well as the speeches given by religious figures (such as Pope John Paul II, and Pope Francis) and several leaders from countries in the Middle East and North Africa (such as Shimon Peres, Yasser Arafat, Hosni Mubarak, Léopold Sédar Senghor or King Hussein of Jordan).

The full text of the speeches is given in both English and French, regardless of the original language used. The archive is searchable by country, by name, and chronologically.

Aims and achievement 

Article 1(a) of the Statute states that "The aim of the Council of Europe is to achieve a greater unity between its members for the purpose of safeguarding and realising the ideals and principles which are their common heritage and facilitating their economic and social progress." Membership is open to all European states who seek harmony, cooperation, good governance and human rights, accepting the principle of the rule of law and are able and willing to guarantee democracy, fundamental human rights and freedoms.

Whereas the member states of the European Union transfer part of their national legislative and executive powers to the European Commission and the European Parliament, Council of Europe member states maintain their sovereignty but commit themselves through conventions/treaties (international law) and co-operate on the basis of common values and common political decisions. Those conventions and decisions are developed by the member states working together at the Council of Europe. Both organisations function as concentric circles around the common foundations for European cooperation and harmony, with the Council of Europe being the geographically wider circle. The European Union could be seen as the smaller circle with a much higher level of integration through the transfer of powers from the national to the EU level. "The Council of Europe and the European Union: different roles, shared values." Council of Europe conventions/treaties are also open for signature to non-member states, thus facilitating equal co-operation with countries outside Europe.

The Council of Europe's most famous achievement is the European Convention on Human Rights, which was adopted in 1950 following a report by the PACE, and followed on from the United Nations 'Universal Declaration of Human Rights' (UDHR). The Convention created the European Court of Human Rights in Strasbourg. The Court supervises compliance with the European Convention on Human Rights and thus functions as the highest European court. It is to this court that Europeans can bring cases if they believe that a member country has violated their fundamental rights and freedoms.

The various activities and achievements of the Council of Europe can be found in detail on its official website. The Council of Europe works in the following areas:

 Protection of the rule of law and fostering legal co-operation through some 200 conventions and other treaties, including such leading instruments as the Convention on Cybercrime, the Convention on the Prevention of Terrorism, Conventions against Corruption and Organised Crime, the Convention on Action against Trafficking in Human Beings, and the Convention on Human Rights and Biomedicine.
 CODEXTER, designed to co-ordinate counter-terrorism measures
 The European Commission for the Efficiency of Justice (CEPEJ)
 Protection of human rights, notably through:
 the European Convention on Human Rights
 the European Committee for the Prevention of Torture
 the European Commission against Racism and Intolerance
 the Convention on Action against Trafficking in Human Beings
 the Convention for the protection of individuals with regard to automatic processing of personal data
 the Convention on the Protection of Children against Sexual Exploitation and Sexual Abuse
 The Convention on preventing and combating violence against women and domestic violence.
 social rights under the European Social Charter
 European Charter of Local Self-Government guaranteeing the political, administrative and financial independence of local authorities.
 linguistic rights under the European Charter for Regional or Minority Languages
 minority rights under the Framework Convention for the Protection of National Minorities
 Media freedom under Article 10 of the European Convention on Human Rights and the European Convention on Transfrontier Television
 Protection of democracy through parliamentary scrutiny and election monitoring by its Parliamentary Assembly as well as assistance in democratic reforms, in particular by the Venice Commission.
 Promotion of cultural cooperation and diversity under the Council of Europe's Cultural Convention of 1954 and several conventions on the protection of cultural heritage as well as through its Centre for Modern Languages in Graz, Austria, and its North-South Centre in Lisbon, Portugal.
 Promotion of the right to education under Article 2 of the first Protocol to the European Convention on Human Rights and several conventions on the recognition of university studies and diplomas (see also Bologna Process and Lisbon Recognition Convention).
 Promotion of fair sport through the Anti-Doping Convention
 Promotion of European youth exchanges and cooperation through European Youth Centres in Strasbourg and Budapest, Hungary.
 Promotion of the quality of medicines throughout Europe by the European Directorate for the Quality of Medicines and its European Pharmacopoeia.

Support for intercultural integration through the Intercultural Cities (ICC) program. This program offers information and advice for local authorities on the integration of minorities and the prevention of discrimination.

Institutions 

The institutions of the Council of Europe are:

 The Secretary General, who is elected for a term of five years by the PACE and heads the Secretariat of the Council of Europe. Thorbjørn Jagland, the former Prime Minister of Norway, was elected Secretary General of the Council of Europe on 29 September 2009. In June 2014, he became the first Secretary General to be re-elected, commencing his second term in office on 1 October 2014.
 The Committee of Ministers, comprising the Ministers of Foreign Affairs of all 47 member states who are represented by their Permanent Representatives and Ambassadors accredited to the Council of Europe. Committee of Ministers' presidencies are held in alphabetical order for six months following the English alphabet: Turkey 11/2010-05/2011, Ukraine 05/2011-11/2011, the United Kingdom 11/2011-05/2012, Albania 05/2012-11/2012, Andorra 11/2012-05/2013, Armenia 05/2013-11/2013, Austria 11/2013-05/2014, and so on.

 The Parliamentary Assembly of the Council of Europe (PACE), which comprises national parliamentarians from all member states. Adopting resolutions and recommendations to governments, the Assembly holds a dialogue with its governmental counterpart, the Committee of Ministers, and is often regarded as the "motor" of the organisation. The national parliamentary delegations to the Assembly must reflect the political spectrum of their national parliament, i.e. comprise government and opposition parties. The Assembly appoints members as rapporteurs with the mandate to prepare parliamentary reports on specific subjects. The British MP Sir David Maxwell-Fyfe was rapporteur for the drafting of the European Convention on Human Rights. Dick Marty's reports on secret CIA detentions and rendition flights in Europe became quite famous in 2006 and 2007. Other Assembly reports were instrumental in, for example, the abolition of the death penalty in Europe, highlighting the political and human rights situation in Chechnya, identifying who was responsible for disappeared persons in Belarus, chronicling threats to freedom of expression in the media and many other subjects.
 The Congress of the Council of Europe (Congress of Local and Regional Authorities of Europe), which was created in 1994 and comprises political representatives from local and regional authorities in all member states. The most influential instruments of the Council of Europe in this field are the European Charter of Local Self-Government of 1985 and the European Outline Convention on Transfrontier Co-operation between Territorial Communities or Authorities of 1980.
 The European Court of Human Rights, created under the European Convention on Human Rights of 1950, is composed of a judge from each member state elected for a single, non-renewable term of nine years by the PACE and is headed by the elected president of the court. The current president of the court is Guido Raimondi from Italy. Under the recent Protocol No. 14 to the European Convention on Human Rights, the Court's case processing was reformed and streamlined. Ratification of Protocol No. 14 was delayed by Russia for a number of years, but won support to be passed in January 2010.
 The Commissioner for Human Rights is elected by the PACE for a non-renewable term of six years since the creation of this position in 1999. Since April 2018, this position has been held by Dunja Mijatović from Bosnia and Herzegovina.
 The Conference of INGOs. NGOs can participate in the INGOs Conference of the Council of Europe. Since the [Resolution (2003)8] adopted by the Committee of Ministers on 19 November 2003, they are given a "participatory status".
 The Joint Council on Youth of the Council of Europe. The European Steering Committee (CDEJ) on Youth and the Advisory Council on Youth (CCJ) of the Council of Europe form together the Joint Council on Youth (CMJ). The CDEJ brings together representatives of ministries or bodies responsible for youth matters from the 50 States Parties to the European Cultural Convention. The CDEJ fosters cooperation between governments in the youth sector and provides a framework for comparing national youth policies, exchanging best practices and drafting standard-setting texts. The Advisory Council on Youth comprises 30 representatives of non-governmental youth organisations and networks. It provides opinions and input from youth NGOs on all youth sector activities and ensures that young people are involved in the council's other activities.
 Information Offices of the Council of Europe in many member states.

The CoE system also includes a number of semi-autonomous structures known as "Partial Agreements", some of which are also open to non-member states:

 The Council of Europe Development Bank in Paris
 The European Directorate for the Quality of Medicines with its European Pharmacopoeia
 The European Audiovisual Observatory
 The European Support Fund Eurimages for the co-production and distribution of films.
 The Enlarged Partial Agreement on Cultural Routes, which awards the certification "Cultural Route of the Council of Europe" to transnational networks promoting European heritage and intercultural dialogue (Luxembourg)
 The Pompidou Group – Cooperation Group to Combat Drug Abuse and Illicit Trafficking in Drugs.
 The European Commission for Democracy through Law, better known as the Venice Commission
 The Group of States Against Corruption (GRECO)
 The European and Mediterranean Major Hazards Agreement (EUR-OPA) which is a platform for cooperation between European and Southern Mediterranean countries in the field of major natural and technological disasters.
 The Enlarged Partial Agreement on Sport, which is open to accession by states and sports associations.
 The North-South Centre of the Council of Europe in Lisbon (Portugal)
 The Centre for Modern Languages is in Graz (Austria)

Headquarters and buildings 

The seat of the Council of Europe is in Strasbourg, France. First meetings were held in Strasbourg's University Palace in 1949, but the Council of Europe soon moved into its own buildings. The Council of Europe's eight main buildings are situated in the Quartier européen, an area in the northeast of Strasbourg spread over the three districts of Le Wacken, La Robertsau and Quartier de l'Orangerie, where are also located the four buildings of the seat of the European Parliament in Strasbourg, the Arte headquarters and the seat of the International Institute of Human Rights.

Building in the area started in 1949 with the predecessor of the Palais de l'Europe, the House of Europe (demolished in 1977), and came to a provisional end in 2007 with the opening of the New General Office Building, later named "Agora", in 2008. The Palais de l'Europe (Palace of Europe) and the Art Nouveau Villa Schutzenberger (seat of the European Audiovisual Observatory) are in the Orangerie district, and the European Court of Human Rights, the EDQM and the Agora Building are in the Robertsau district. The Agora building has been voted "best international business centre real estate project of 2007" on 13 March 2008, at the MIPIM 2008. The European Youth Centre is located in the Wacken district.

Besides its headquarters in Strasbourg, the Council of Europe is also present in other cities and countries. The Council of Europe Development Bank has its seat in Paris, the North-South Centre of the Council of Europe is established in Lisbon, Portugal, and the Centre for Modern Languages is in Graz, Austria. There are European Youth Centres in Budapest, Hungary, and in Strasbourg. The European Wergeland Centre, a new Resource Centre on education for intercultural dialogue, human rights and democratic citizenship, operated in cooperation with the Norwegian Government, opened in Oslo, Norway, in February 2009.

The Council of Europe has external offices all over the European continent and beyond. There are four ‘Programme Offices’, namely in Ankara, Podgorica, Skopje, and Venice. There are also ‘Council of Europe Offices’ in Baku, Belgrade, Chisinau, Kyiv, Paris, Pristina, Sarajevo, Tbilisi, Tirana, and Yerevan. Bucharest has a Council of Europe Office on Cybercrime. There are also Council of Europe Offices in non-European capital cities like Rabat and Tunis.

Additionally, there are 4 "Council of Europe Liaison Offices", this includes:

 Council of Europe Liaison Office in Brussels: The office is in charge of liaison with the European Union
 Council of Europe Office in Geneva:  Permanent Delegation of the Council of Europe to the United Nations Office and other international organisations in Geneva
 Council of Europe Office in Vienna: The office is in charge of liaison with the OSCE, United Nations Office, and other international organisations in Vienna
 Council of Europe Office in Warsaw: The office is in charge of liaison with other international organisations and institutions in Warsaw, in particular, the Office for Democratic Institutions and Human Rights (OSCE/ODIHR)

Member states, observers, partners

Eligibility 

There are two main criteria for membership: geographic (Article 4 of the Council of Europe Statute specifies that membership is open to any "European" State) and political (Article 3 of the Statute states applying for membership must accept democratic values—"Every member of the Council of Europe must accept the principles of the rule of law and the enjoyment by all persons within its jurisdiction of human rights and fundamental freedoms, and collaborate sincerely and effectively in the realisation of the aim of the Council as specified in Chapter I").

Since "Europe" is not defined in international law, the definition of "Europe" has been a question that has recurred during the CoE's history. Turkey was admitted in 1950, although it is a transcontinental state that lies mostly in Asia, with a smaller portion in Europe. In 1994, the PACE adopted Recommendation 1247, which said that admission to the CoE should be "in principle open only to states whose national territory lies wholly or partly in Europe"; later, however, the Assembly extended eligibility to apply and be admitted to Armenia, Azerbaijan, and Georgia.

Member states and observers 

The Council of Europe was founded on 5 May 1949 by Belgium, Denmark, France, Ireland, Italy, Luxembourg, Netherlands, Norway, Sweden and the United Kingdom. Greece and Turkey joined 3 months later. Iceland West Germany and Saarland Protectorate joined the Council of Europe as associate members in 1950. West Germany became a full member in 1951, and the Saar withdrew its application after it joined West Germany following the 1955 Saar Statute referendum. Joining later were Austria (1956), Cyprus (1961), Switzerland (1963), Malta (1965), and Portugal (1976). Spain joined in 1977, two years after the death of its dictator Francisco Franco and the Spanish transition to democracy. Next to join were Liechtenstein (1978), San Marino (1988) and Finland (1989). After the fall of Communism with the Revolutions of 1989 and the collapse of the Soviet Union, the post-Soviet states in Europe that began democratization joined: Hungary (1990), Poland (1991), Bulgaria (1992), Estonia (1993), Lithuania (1993), Slovenia (1993), the Czech Republic (1993), Slovakia (1993), Romania (1993), Latvia (1995), Moldova (1995), Albania (1995), Ukraine (1995), the former Yugoslav Republic of Macedonia (1995) (later renamed North Macedonia), Russia (1996, expelled 2022), Croatia (1996), Georgia (1999), Armenia (2001), Azerbaijan (2001), Bosnia and Herzegovina (2002) and Serbia and Montenegro (later Serbia) (2003). Also joining were the small Western European nations of Andorra (1994) and Monaco (2004). The Council now has 46 member states, with Montenegro (2007) being the latest to join.46 "Member States", Council of Europe.

Although most Council members are predominantly Christian in heritage, there are three Muslim-majority member states: Turkey, Albania, and Azerbaijan.

The CoE has granted some countries a status that allows them to participate in CoE activities without being full members. There are three types of nonmember status: associate member, special guest and observer. Associate member status is no longer used. "Special guest" status was used as a transitional status for post-Soviet countries that wished to join the council after the fall of the Berlin Wall and is no longer commonly used. "Observer" status is for non-European nations who accept democracy, rule of law, and human rights, and wish to participate in Council initiatives. The United States became an observer state in 1995. Currently, Canada, the Holy See, Japan, Mexico, and the United States are observer states, while Israel is an observer to the PACE.

Withdrawal, suspension, and expulsion 

The Statute of the Council of Europe provides for the voluntary suspension, involuntary suspension, and exclusion of members. Article 8 of the Statute provides that any member who has "seriously violated" Article 3 may be suspended from its rights of representation, and that the Committee of Ministers may request that such a member withdraws from the Council under Article 7. (The Statute does not define the "serious violation" phrase. Under Article 8 of the Statute, if a member state fails to withdraw upon request, the Committee may terminate its membership, in consultation with the PACE.

The Council suspended Greece in 1967, after a military coup d'état, and the Greek junta withdrew from the CoE. Greece was readmitted to the council in 1974.

Suspension and exclusion of Russia 

Russia became a member of the Council of Europe in 1996. In 2014, after Russia invaded and annexed Crimea from Ukraine and supported separatists in eastern Ukraine, precipitating a bloody conflict, the Council stripped Russia of its voting rights in the PACE. In response, Russia began to boycott the Assembly in 2016, and beginning in 2017 refused to pay its annual membership dues of 32.6 million euros (US$37.1 million) to the Council placing the institution under financial strain.

Russia claimed that its suspension by the council was unfair, and demanded the restoration of voting rights. Russia had threatened to withdraw from the Council unless its voting rights were restored in time for the election of a new secretary general. European Council secretary-general Thorbjørn Jagland organized a special committee to find a compromise with Russia in early 2018, a move that was criticized as giving in to alleged Russian pressure by Council members and academic observers, especially if voting sanctions were lifted. In June 2019, the Council voted (on a 118–62 vote, with 10 abstentions) to restore Russia's voting rights in the council. Opponents of lifting the suspension included Ukraine and other post-Soviet countries, such as Poland and the Baltic states, who argued that readmission amounted to normalizing Russia's malign activity. Supporters of restoring Russia's council rights included France and Germany, which argued that a Russian withdrawal from the council would be harmful because it would deprive Russian citizens of their ability to initiate cases in the European Court of Human Rights.

On 3 March 2022, after Russia launched a full-scale military invasion of Ukraine, the council suspended Russia for violations of the council's statute and the European Convention on Human Rights (ECHR). The suspension blocked Russia from participation in the council's ministerial council, the PACE, and the Council of the Baltic Sea States, but still left Russia obligated to follow the ECHR. On 15 March 2022, hours before the vote to expel the country, Russia initiated a voluntary withdrawal procedure from the council. The Russian delegation planned to deliver its formal withdrawal on 31 December 2022, and announced its intent to denounce the ECHR. However, on the same day, the council's Committee of Ministers decided Russia's membership in the council would be terminated immediately, and determined that Russia had been excluded from the Council instead under its exclusion mechanism rather than the withdrawal mechanism. After being excluded from the Council of Europe, Russia's former president and prime minister Dmitry Medvedev endorsed restoring the death penalty in Russia.

Co-operation

Non-member states 
The Council of Europe works mainly through international treaties, usually called conventions in its system. By drafting conventions or international treaties, common legal standards are set for its member states. However, several conventions have also been opened for signature to non-member states. Important examples are the Convention on Cybercrime (signed for example, by Canada, Japan, South Africa and the United States), the Lisbon Recognition Convention on the recognition of study periods and degrees (signed for example, by Australia, Belarus, Canada, the Holy See, Israel, Kazakhstan, Kyrgyzstan, New Zealand and the United States), the Anti-doping Convention (signed, for example, by Australia, Belarus, Canada and Tunisia) and the Convention on the Conservation of European Wildlife and Natural Habitats (signed for example, by Burkina Faso, Morocco, Tunisia and Senegal as well as the European Community). Non-member states also participate in several partial agreements, such as the Venice Commission, the Group of States Against Corruption (GRECO), the European Pharmacopoeia Commission and the North-South Centre.

Invitations to sign and ratify relevant conventions of the Council of Europe on a case-by-case basis are sent to three groups of non-member entities:
 Non-European states: Algeria, Argentina, Australia, Bahamas, Bolivia, Brazil, Burkina Faso, Chile, China, Colombia, Costa Rica, Dominican Republic, Ecuador, El Salvador, Honduras, South Korea, Kyrgyzstan, Lebanon, Malaysia, Mauritius, Morocco, New Zealand, Panama, Peru, Philippines, Senegal, South Africa, Syria, Tajikistan, Tonga, Trinidad and Tobago, Tunisia, Uruguay, Venezuela and the observers Canada, Israel, Japan, Mexico, United States.
 European states: Kosovo, Kazakhstan, Belarus, Russia and the observer Vatican City.
 the European Community and later the European Union after its legal personality was established by the ratification of the EU's Lisbon Treaty.

European Union 

The Council of Europe is not to be confused with the Council of the European Union (the "Council of Ministers") or the European Council. These belong to the European Union, which is separate from the Council of Europe, although they have shared the same European flag and anthem since the 1980s since they both work for European integration. Nor is the Council of Europe to be confused with the European Union itself.

The Council of Europe is an entirely separate body from the European Union. It is not controlled by it.

Cooperation between the European Union and the Council of Europe has recently been reinforced, notably on culture and education as well as on the international enforcement of justice and Human Rights.

The European Union is expected to accede to the European Convention on Human Rights (the convention). There are also concerns about consistency in case law – the European Court of Justice (the EU's court in Luxembourg) is treating the convention as part of the legal system of all EU member states in order to prevent conflict between its judgements and those of the European Court of Human Rights (the court in Strasbourg interpreting the convention). Protocol No. 14 of the convention is designed to allow the EU to accede to it and the EU Treaty of Lisbon contains a protocol binding the EU to join. The EU would thus be subject to its human rights law and external monitoring as its member states currently are.

Schools of Political Studies 

The Council of Europe Schools of political studies were established to train future generations of political, economic, social and cultural leaders in countries in transition. With the participation of national and international experts, they run annual series of seminars and conferences on topics such as European integration, democracy, human rights, the rule of law and globalisation. The first School of Political Studies was created in Moscow in 1992. Since then, 20 other schools have been set up along the same lines and now form an Association; a genuine network now covering the whole of Eastern and South-Eastern Europe and the Caucasus, as well as some countries in the Southern Mediterranean region. The Council of Europe Schools of political studies is part of the Education Department which is part of the Directorate of Democratic Participation within the Directorate General of Democracy ("DGII") of the Council of Europe.

United Nations 
Cooperation between the CoE and the UN started with the agreement signed by the Secretariats of these institutions on 15 December 1951. On 17 October 1989, the General Assembly of the United Nations approved a resolution on granting observer status to the Council of Europe which was proposed by several member states of the CoE. Currently, the Council of Europe holds observer status with the United Nations and is regularly represented in the UN General Assembly. It has organised the regional UN conferences against racism and on women. It co-operates with the United Nations at many levels, in particular in the areas of human rights, minorities, migration and counter-terrorism. In November 2016, the UN General Assembly adopted by consensus Resolution (A/Res/71/17) on Cooperation between the United Nations and the Council of Europe whereby it acknowledged the contribution of the Council of Europe to the protection and strengthening of human rights and fundamental freedoms, democracy and the rule of law, welcomed the ongoing co-operation in a variety of fields.

Non-governmental organisations 

Non-governmental organisations (NGOs) can participate in the INGOs Conference of the Council of Europe and become observers to inter-governmental committees of experts. The Council of Europe drafted the European Convention on the Recognition of the Legal Personality of International Non-Governmental Organisations in 1986, which sets the legal basis for the existence and work of NGOs in Europe. Article 11 of the European Convention on Human Rights protects the right to freedom of association, which is also a fundamental norm for NGOs. The rules for consultative status for INGOs appended to the resolution (93)38 "On relation between the Council of Europe and non-governmental organisations", adopted by the Committee of Ministers on 18 October 1993 at the 500th meeting of the Ministers' Deputies. On 19 November 2003, the Committee of Ministers changed the consultative status into a participatory status, "considering that it is indispensable that the rules governing the relations between the Council of Europe and NGOs evolve to reflect the active participation of international non-governmental organisations (INGOs) in the Organisation's policy and work programme".

Others 

On 30 May 2018, the Council of Europe signed a memorandum of understanding with the European football confederation UEFA.

The Council of Europe also signed an agreement with FIFA in which the two agreed to strengthen future cooperation in areas of common interests. The deal which included cooperation between member states in the sport of football and safety and security at football matches was finalized in October 2018.

Characteristics

Privileges and immunities 
The General Agreement on Privileges and Immunities of the Council of Europe grants the organisation certain privileges and immunities.

The working conditions of staff are governed by the council's staff regulations, which are public. Salaries and emoluments paid by the Council of Europe to its officials are tax-exempt on the basis of Article 18 of the General Agreement on Privileges and Immunities of the Council of Europe.

Symbol and anthem 

The Council of Europe created, and has since 1955 used as its official symbol, the European Flag with 12 golden stars arranged in a circle on a blue background.

Its musical anthem since 1972, the "European anthem", is based on the "Ode to Joy" theme from Ludwig van Beethoven's ninth symphony.

On 5 May 1964, the 15th anniversary of its founding, the Council of Europe established 5 May as Europe Day.

The wide private and public use of the European Flag is encouraged to symbolise a European dimension. To avoid confusion with the European Union which subsequently adopted the same flag in the 1980s, as well as other European institutions, the Council of Europe often uses a modified version with a lower-case "e" surrounding the stars which are referred to as the "Council of Europe Logo".

Criticism and controversies 

The Council of Europe has been accused of not having any meaningful purpose, being superfluous in its aims to other pan-European bodies, including the European Union and OSCE. In 2013 The Economist agreed, saying that the "Council of Europe's credibility is on the line". Both Human Rights Watch and the European Stability Initiative have called on the Council of Europe to undertake concrete actions to show that it is willing and able to return to its "original mission to protect and ensure human rights".

In October 2022, a new and different Pan-European meeting of 44 states was held, as the "inaugural summit of the European Political Community", a new forum largely organized by French President Emmanuel Macron. The Council of Europe, sidelined, reportedly was "perplexed" with this development, with a spokesperson stating "In the field of human rights, democracy and the rule of law, such a pan-European community already exists: it is the Council of Europe."  A feature of the new forum is that Russia and Belarus are deliberately excluded, but that does not immediately explain the need for a different entity,  Russia is no longer a member of the Council of Europe and Belarus only participates partially, as a non-member.

"Caviar diplomacy" scandal 

After Azerbaijan joined the CoE in 2001, both the Council and its Parliamentary Assembly were criticized for having a weak response to election rigging and human rights violations in Azerbaijan. The Human Rights Watch criticized the Council of Europe in 2014 for allowing Azerbaijan to assume the six-month rotating chairmanship of the council's Committee of Ministers, writing that the Azeri government's repression of human rights defenders, dissidents, and journalists "shows sheer contempt for its commitments to the Council of Europe". An internal inquiry was set up in 2017 amid allegations of bribery by Azerbajian government officials and criticism of "caviar diplomacy at the Council. A 219-page report was issued in 2018 after a ten-month investigation. It concluded that several members of the Parliamentary Assembly broke CoE ethical rules and were "strongly suspected" of corruption; it strongly criticized former Parliamentary Assembly president Pedro Agramunt and suggested that he had engaged in "corruptive activities" before his resignation under pressure in 2017. The inquiry also named Italian member Luca Volontè as a suspect in "activities of a corruptive nature". Volontè was investigated by Italian police and accused by Italian prosecutors in 2017 of receiving over 2.39 million euros in bribes in exchange for working for Azerbaijan in the parliamentary assembly, and that in 2013 he played a key role in orchestrating the defeat of a highly critical report on the abuse of political prisoners in Azerbaijan. In 2021, Volontè was convicted of accepting bribes from Azerbaijani officials to water down critiques of the nation's human rights record, and he was sentenced by a court in Milan to four years in prison.

See also 

 CAHDI
 Common European Framework of Reference for Languages
 Conference of Specialised Ministers
 Council of Europe Archives
 The Europe Prize
 European Anti-fraud Office
 Film Award of the Council of Europe
 Moneyval
 International organisations in Europe, and co-ordinated organisations
 List of Council of Europe treaties
 List of linguistic rights in European constitutions
 North–South Centre of the Council of Europe

Notes

Footnotes

References

Further reading 

 
 Dinan, Desmond. Europe Recast: A History of European Union (2nd ed. 2004). excerpt ; the excerpt covers the historiography
 Gillingham, John. Coal, Steel, and the Rebirth of Europe, 1945–1955: The Germans and French from Ruhr Conflict to Economic Community (Cambridge UP, 2004).
 
 Kopf, Susanne. Debating the European Union Transnationally: Wikipedians' Construction of the EU on a Wikipedia Talk Page (2001–2015). (PhD dissertation Lancaster University, 2018)online.
 Moravcsik, Andrew. The Choice for Europe: Social Purpose and State Power from Messina to Maastricht (Cornell UP, 1998). . .
 Stone, Dan. Goodbye to All That?: The Story of Europe Since 1945 (Oxford UP, 2014).

External links 

 
 General Agreement on Privileges and Immunities of the Council of Europe, Paris, 2 September 1949

 
1949 establishments in England
Councils
International organizations based in Europe
International organizations based in France
Organizations based in Strasbourg
Organizations established in 1949
Politics of Europe
United Nations General Assembly observers